The 1946 Tennessee A&I Tigers football team represented Tennessee Agricultural & Industrial State College as a member of the Midwest Athletic Association (MAA) during the 1946 college football season. In their third season under head coach Henry Kean, the Tigers compiled a 10–1 record, won the MAA championship, shut out six of eleven opponents, defeated West Virginia State in the Derby Bowl and Louisville Municipal in the Vulcan Bowl, and outscored all opponents by a total of 247 to 61. The team played its home games at Tennessee State Stadium and Sulphur Dell in Nashville, Tennessee.

The Dickinson System rated Tennessee A&I as the No. 1 black college football team for 1946 with a score of 27.27, ahead of No. 2 Morgan State with a score of 26.0, No. 3 Tuskegee with a score of 25.0, and No. 4 Wilberforce with a score of 23.57.  The Pittsburgh Courier recognized Tennessee A&I and Morgan State as the 1946 black college national co-champions. 

Key players included fullback Ralph Pulley.

Schedule

References

Tennessee AandI
Tennessee State Tigers football seasons
Black college football national champions
College football undefeated seasons
Tennessee AandI Tigers football